The Atlantic meridional overturning circulation (AMOC) is part of a global thermohaline circulation in the oceans and is the zonally integrated component of surface and deep currents in the Atlantic Ocean. It is characterized by a northward flow of warm, salty water in the upper layers of the Atlantic, and a southward flow of colder, deep waters. These "limbs" are linked by regions of overturning in the Nordic and Labrador Seas and the Southern Ocean, although the extent of overturning in the Labrador Sea is disputed. The AMOC is an important component of the Earth's climate system, and is a result of both atmospheric and thermohaline drivers.

Climate change has the potential to weaken the AMOC through increases in ocean heat content and elevated freshwater flows from the melting ice sheets. Oceanographic reconstructions generally suggest that the AMOC is already weaker than it was before the Industrial Revolution, although there is a robust debate over the role of climate change versus the circulation's century-scale and millennial-scale variability. Climate models consistently project that the AMOC would weaken further over the 21st century, which would affect average temperature over areas like Scandinavia and Britain that are warmed by the North Atlantic drift, as well as accelerate sea level rise around North America and reduce primary production in the North Atlantic.

Severe weakening of the AMOC has the potential to cause an outright collapse of the circulation, which would not be easily reversible and thus constitute one of the tipping points in the climate system. A shutdown would have far greater impacts than a slowdown on both the marine and some terrestrial ecosystems: it would lower the average temperature and precipitation in Europe, slashing the region's agricultural output, and may have a substantial effect on extreme weather events. Earth system models used in Coupled Model Intercomparison Project indicate that shutdown is only likely after high levels of warming are sustained well after 2100, but they have been criticized by some researchers for what they saw as excessive stability, and a number of lower-complexity studies argue that a collapse can happen considerably earlier. On the other hand, paleoceanographic research suggests that the AMOC may be even more stable than what is assumed by most models.

General

Thermohaline circulation is a pattern of water flow through the world's oceans. Warm water flows along the surface until it reaches one of a few special spots near Greenland or Antarctica. There, the water sinks, and then crawls across the bottom of the ocean, miles/kilometers deep, over hundreds of years, gradually rising in the Pacific and Indian oceans. Northward surface flow transports a substantial amount of heat energy from the tropics and Southern Hemisphere toward the North Atlantic, where the heat is lost to the atmosphere due to the strong temperature gradient. Upon losing its heat, the water becomes denser and sinks. This densification links the warm, surface limb with the cold, deep return limb at regions of convection in the Nordic and Labrador Seas. The limbs are also linked in regions of upwelling, where a divergence of surface waters causes Ekman suction and an upward flux of deep water.

AMOC consists of upper and lower cells. The upper cell consists of northward surface flow as well as southward return flow of North Atlantic Deep Water (NADW). The lower cell represents northward flow of dense Antarctic Bottom Water (AABW) – this bathes the abyssal ocean.

AMOC exerts a major control on North Atlantic sea level, particularly along the Northeast Coast of North America. Exceptional AMOC weakening during the winter of 2009–10 has been implicated in a damaging 13 cm sea level rise along the New York coastline.

There may be two stable states of the AMOC: a strong circulation (as seen over recent millennia) and a weak circulation mode, as suggested by atmosphere-ocean coupled general circulation models and Earth systems models of intermediate complexity. A number of Earth system models do not identify this bistability, however.

AMOC and climate

The net northward heat transport in the Atlantic is unique among global oceans, and is responsible for the relative warmth of the Northern Hemisphere. AMOC carries up to 25% of the northward global atmosphere-ocean heat transport in the northern hemisphere. This is generally thought to ameliorate the climate of Northwest Europe, although this effect is the subject of debate.

As well as acting as a heat pump and high-latitude heat sink, AMOC is the largest carbon sink in the Northern Hemisphere, sequestering approximately  C/year. This sequestration has significant implications for evolution of anthropogenic global warming – especially with respect to the recent and projected future decline in AMOC vigor.

Thermohaline circulation and fresh water 

Heat is transported from the equator polewards  mostly by the atmosphere  but also by ocean currents, with warm water near the surface and cold water at deeper levels. The best known segment of this circulation is the Gulf Stream, a wind-driven gyre, which transports warm water from the Caribbean northwards. A northwards branch of the Gulf Stream, the North Atlantic Drift, is part of the thermohaline circulation (THC), transporting warmth further north to the North Atlantic, where its effect in warming the atmosphere contributes to warming Europe.

The evaporation of ocean water in the North Atlantic increases the salinity of the water as well as cooling it, both actions increasing the density of water at the surface. Formation of sea ice further increases the salinity and density, because salt is ejected into the ocean when sea ice forms. This dense water then sinks and the circulation stream continues in a southerly direction. However, the Atlantic Meridional Overturning Circulation (AMOC) is driven by ocean temperature and salinity differences. But freshwater decreases ocean water salinity, and through this process prevents colder waters sinking. This mechanism possibly caused the cold ocean surface temperature anomaly currently observed near Greenland (Cold blob (North Atlantic)).

Global warming could lead to an increase in freshwater in the northern oceans, by melting glaciers in Greenland, and by increasing precipitation, especially through Siberian rivers.

Studies of the Florida Current suggest that the Gulf Stream weakens with cooling, being weakest (by ~10%) during the Little Ice Age.

Regions of overturning

Convection and return flow in the Nordic Seas

Low air temperatures at high latitudes cause substantial sea-air heat flux, driving a density increase and convection in the water column. Open ocean convection occurs in deep plumes and is particularly strong in winter when the sea-air temperature difference is largest. Of the 6 sverdrup (Sv) of dense water that flows southward over the GSR (Greenland-Scotland Ridge), 3 Sv does so via the Denmark Strait forming Denmark Strait Overflow Water (DSOW). 0.5-1 Sv flows over the Iceland-Faroe ridge and the remaining 2–2.5 Sv returns through the Faroe-Shetland Channel; these two flows form Iceland Scotland Overflow Water (ISOW). The majority of flow over the Faroe-Shetland ridge flows through the Faroe-Bank Channel and soon joins that which flowed over the Iceland-Faroe ridge, to flow southward at depth along the Eastern flank of the Reykjanes Ridge. As ISOW overflows the GSR (Greenland-Scotland Ridge), it turbulently entrains intermediate density waters such as Sub-Polar Mode water and Labrador Sea Water. This grouping of water-masses then moves geostrophically southward along the East flank of Reykjanes Ridge, through the Charlie Gibbs Fracture Zone and then northward to join DSOW. These waters are sometimes referred to as Nordic Seas Overflow Water (NSOW). NSOW flows cyclonically following the surface route of the SPG (sub-polar gyre) around the Labrador Sea and further entrains Labrador Sea Water (LSW).

Convection is known to be suppressed at these high latitudes by sea-ice cover. Floating sea ice "caps" the surface, reducing the ability for heat to move from the sea to the air. This in turn reduces convection and deep return flow from the region. The summer Arctic sea ice cover has undergone dramatic retreat since satellite records began in 1979, amounting to a loss of almost 30% of the September ice cover in 39 years.  Climate model simulations suggest that rapid and sustained September Arctic ice loss is likely in future 21st century climate projections.

Convection and entrainment in the Labrador Sea

Characteristically fresh LSW is formed at intermediate depths by deep convection in the central Labrador Sea, particularly during winter storms. This convection is not deep enough to penetrate into the NSOW layer which forms the deep waters of the Labrador Sea. LSW joins NSOW to move southward out of the Labrador Sea: while NSOW easily passes under the NAC at the North-West Corner, some LSW is retained. This diversion and retention by the SPG explains its presence and entrainment near the GSR (Greenland-Scotland Ridge) overflows. Most of the diverted LSW however splits off before the CGFZ (Charlie-Gibbs Fracture Zone) and remains in the western SPG. LSW production is highly dependent on sea-air heat flux and yearly production typically ranges from 3–9 Sv. ISOW is produced in proportion to the density gradient across the Iceland-Scotland Ridge and as such is sensitive to LSW production which affects the downstream density  More indirectly, increased LSW production is associated with a strengthened SPG and hypothesized to be anti-correlated with ISOW  This interplay confounds any simple extension of a reduction in individual overflow waters to a reduction in AMOC. LSW production is understood to have been minimal prior to the 8.2 ka event, with the SPG thought to have existed before in a weakened, non-convective state. There is debate about the extent to which convection in the Labrador Sea plays a role in AMOC circulation, particularly in the connection between Labrador sea variability and AMOC variability. Observational studies have been inconclusive about whether this connection exists. New observations with the OSNAP array show little contribution from the Labrador Sea to overturning, and hydrographic observations from ships dating back to 1990 show similar results. Nevertheless, older estimates of LSW formation using different techniques suggest larger overturning.

Atlantic upwelling

For reasons of conservation of mass, the global ocean system must upwell an equal volume of water to that downwelled. Upwelling in the Atlantic itself occurs mostly due to coastal and equatorial upwelling mechanisms.

Coastal upwelling occurs as a result of Ekman transport along the interface between land and a wind-driven current. In the Atlantic, this particularly occurs around the Canary Current and Benguela Current. Upwelling in these two regions has been modelled to be in antiphase, an effect known as "upwelling see-saw".

Equatorial upwelling generally occurs due to atmospheric forcing and divergence due to the opposing direction of the Coriolis force either side of the equator. The Atlantic features more complex mechanisms such as migration of the thermocline, particularly in the Eastern Atlantic.

Southern Ocean upwelling

North Atlantic Deep Water is primarily upwelled at the southern end of the Atlantic transect, in the Southern Ocean. This upwelling comprises the majority of upwelling normally associated with AMOC, and links it with the global circulation. On a global scale, observations suggest 80% of deepwater upwells in the Southern Ocean.

This upwelling supplies large quantities of nutrients to the surface, which supports biological activity. Surface supply of nutrients is critical to the ocean's functioning as a carbon sink on long timescales. Furthermore, upwelled water has low concentrations of dissolved carbon, as the water is typically 1000 years old and has not been sensitive to anthropogenic  increases in the atmosphere. Because of its low carbon concentration, this upwelling functions as a carbon sink. Variability in the carbon sink over the observational period has been closely studied and debated. The size of the sink is understood to have decreased until 2002, and then increased until 2012.

After upwelling, the water is understood to take one of two pathways: water surfacing near to sea-ice generally forms dense bottomwater and is committed to AMOC's lower cell; water surfacing at lower latitudes moves further northward due to Ekman transport and is committed to the upper cell.

Slowdown or shutdown of the thermohaline circulation 

The slowdown or shutdown of the thermohaline circulation is a hypothesized effect of climate change on a major ocean circulation. The Gulf Stream is part of this circulation, and is part of the reason why northern Europe is warmer than it would normally be; Edinburgh has the same latitude as Moscow. The Thermohaline Circulation influences the climate all over the world. The impacts of the decline and potential shutdown of the AMOC could include losses in agricultural output, ecosystem changes, and the triggering of other climate tipping points. Other likely impacts of AMOC decline include reduced precipitation in mid-latitudes, changing patterns of strong precipitation in the tropics and Europe, and strengthening storms that follow the North Atlantic track. Finally, a decline would also be accompanied by strong sea level rise along the North American coast.

AMOC stability 
Atlantic overturning is not a static feature of global circulation, but rather a sensitive function of temperature and salinity distributions as well as atmospheric forcings. Paleoceanographic reconstructions of AMOC vigour and configuration have revealed significant variations over geologic time complementing variation observed on shorter scales.

Reconstructions of a "shutdown" or "Heinrich" mode of the North Atlantic have fuelled concerns about a future collapse of the overturning circulation due to global climate change. The physics of a shutdown would be underpinned by the Stommel Bifurcation, where increased freshwater forcing or warmer surface waters would lead to a sudden reduction in overturning from which the forcing must be substantially reduced before restart is possible. In 2022, a study suggested that the strongly increasing "memory" of the past multidecadal variations in the system's circulation could act as an early warning indicator of a tipping point.

An AMOC shutdown would be fuelled by two positive feedbacks, the accumulation of both freshwater and heat in areas of downwelling. AMOC exports freshwater from the North Atlantic, and a reduction in overturning would freshen waters and inhibit downwelling. Similar to its export of freshwater, AMOC also partitions heat in the deep-ocean in a global warming regime – it is possible that a weakened AMOC would lead to increasing global temperatures and further stratification and slowdown.  However, this effect would be tempered by a concomitant reduction in warm water transport to the North Atlantic under a weakened AMOC, a negative feedback on the system. Moreover, a paleoceanographic reconstruction from 2022 found only a limited impact from massive freshwater forcing of the final Holocene deglaciation ~11,700–6,000 years ago, when the sea level rise amounted to around 50 metres. It suggested that most models overestimate the impact of freshwater forcing on AMOC.

To complicate the issue of positive and negative feedbacks on temperature and salinity, the wind-driven component of AMOC is still not fully constrained. A relatively larger role of atmospheric forcing would lead to less dependency on the thermohaline factors listed above, and would render AMOC less vulnerable to temperature and salinity changes under global warming.

Multiple equilibria versus single equilibrium 

As well as paleoceanographic reconstruction, the mechanism and likelihood of collapse has been investigated using climate models. Earth Models of Intermediate Complexity (EMICs) have historically predicted a modern AMOC to have multiple equilibria, characterised as warm, cold and shutdown modes. This is in contrast to more comprehensive models, which bias towards a stable AMOC characterised by a single equilibrium. However, doubt is cast upon this stability by a modelled northward freshwater flux which is at odds with observations. An unphysical northward flux in models acts as a negative feedback on overturning and falsely biases towards stability. On the other hand, it was also suggested that the stationary freshwater forcing used in the classic EMICs is too simplistic, and a 2022 study which modified a Stommel's Bifurcation EMIC to use more realistic transient freshwater flux found that this change delayed tipping behavior in the model by over 1000 years. The study suggested that this simulation is more consistent with the reconstructions of AMOC response to Meltwater pulse 1A, when a similarly long delay was observed.

Impacts of a slowdown 

Don Chambers from the University of South Florida College of Marine Science mentioned: "The major effect of a slowing AMOC is expected to be cooler winters and summers around the North Atlantic, and small regional increases in sea level on the North American coast." James Hansen and Makiko Sato stated: 

A 2005 paper suggested that a severe AMOC slowdown would collapse North Atlantic plankton counts to less than half of their pre-disruption biomass due to the increased stratification and the severe drop in nutrient exchange amongst the ocean layers. In 2019, a study suggested that the observed ~10% decline in the phytoplankton productivity in the North Atlantic may provide evidence for this hypothesis.

Downturn of the Atlantic meridional overturning circulation has been tied to extreme regional sea level rise.  
A 2015 paper simulated global ocean changes under AMOC slowdown and collapse scenarios and found that it would greatly decrease dissolved oxygen content in the North Atlantic, even as it would slightly increase globally due to greater increases across the other oceans. In 2018, AMOC slowdown was also tied to increasing coastal deoxygenation.  In 2020,  it was linked to increasing salinity in the South Atlantic.

A study published in 2016 found further evidence for a considerable impact of a slowdown on sea level rise around the U.S. East Coast. The study confirms earlier research findings which identified the region as a hotspot for rising seas, with a potential to divert 3–4 times in the rate of rise, compared to the global average. The researchers attribute the possible increase to an ocean circulation mechanism called deep water formation, which is reduced due to AMOC slow down, leading to more warmer water pockets below the surface. Additionally, the study noted, "Our results suggest that higher carbon emission rates also contribute to increased [sea level rise] in this region compared to the global average."

In 2020, a study evaluated the effects of projected AMOC weakening in the 21st century under the Representative Concentration Pathway 8.5, which portrays a future of continually increasing emissions. In this scenario, a weakened AMOC would also slow down Arctic sea ice decline and delay the emergence of an ice-free Arctic by around 6 years, as well as preventing over 50% of sea ice loss on the edges of Labrador Sea, Greenland Sea, Barents Sea, and Sea of Okhotsk in the years 2061–2080. It also found a southward displacement of Intertropical Convergence Zone, with the associated rainfall increases to the north of it over the tropical Atlantic Ocean and decreases to the south, but cautioned that those trends would be dwarved by the far larger changes in precipitation associated with RCP 8.5. Finally, it found that this slowdown would further deepen Icelandic Low and Aleutian Low due to the displacement of westerly jets.

In 2021, a conceptual network model was developed, connecting the AMOC, Greenland ice sheet, West Antarctic Ice Sheet and the Amazon rainforest (all well-known climate tipping points) through a set of simplified equations. It suggested that while changes to AMOC are unlikely to trigger tipping behaviour in those other elements of the climate system on their own, any other climate element transitioning towards tipping would also affect the others through a connection mediated by the AMOC slowdown, potentially initiating a tipping cascade across multi-century timescales. Consequently, AMOC slowdown would reduce the global warming threshold beyond which any of those four elements (including the AMOC itself) could be expected to tip, as opposed to thresholds established from studying those elements in isolation.

A 2021 assessment of the economic impact of climate tipping points found that while tipping points in general would likely increase the social cost of carbon by about 25%, with a 10% chance of tipping points more than doubling it, AMOC slowdown is likely to do the opposite and reduce the social cost of carbon by about -1.4%, since it would act to counteract the effects of warming in Europe, which is more developed and thus represents a larger fraction of the global GDP than the regions which would be impacted negatively by the slowdown. The following year, this finding, and the broader findings of the study, were severely criticized by a group of scientists including Steve Keen and Timothy Lenton, who considered those findings to be a severe underestimate. The authors have responded to this criticism by noting that their paper should be treated as the starting point in economic assessment of tipping points rather than the final word, and since most of the literature included in their meta-analysis lacks the ability to estimate nonmarket climate damages, their numbers are likely to be underestimates.

Impacts of a shutdown

The possibility that the AMOC is a bistable system (which is either "on" or "off") and could collapse suddenly has been a topic of scientific discussion for a long time. In 2004, The Guardian publicized the findings of a report commissioned by Pentagon defence adviser Andrew Marshall, which suggested that the average annual temperature in Europe would drop by 6 Fahrenheit between 2010 and 2020 as the result of an abrupt AMOC shutdown.

In general, a shutdown of the thermohaline circulation caused by global warming would trigger cooling in the North Atlantic, Europe, and North America. This would particularly affect areas such as the British Isles, France and the Nordic countries, which are warmed by the North Atlantic drift. Major consequences, apart from regional cooling, could also include an increase in major floods and storms, a collapse of plankton stocks, warming or rainfall changes in the tropics or Alaska and Antarctica, more frequent and intense El Niño events due to associated shutdowns of the Kuroshio, Leeuwin, and East Australian Currents that are connected to the same thermohaline circulation as the Gulf Stream, or an oceanic anoxic event — oxygen below surface levels of the stagnant oceans becomes completely depleted – a probable cause of past mass extinction events.

Back in 2002, a study had suggested that an AMOC shutdown may be able to trigger the type of abrupt massive temperature shifts which occurred during the last glacial period: a series of Dansgaard-Oeschger events – rapid climate fluctuations – may be attributed to freshwater forcing at high latitude interrupting the THC. 2002 model runs in which the THC is forced to shut down do show cooling – locally up to 8 °C (14 °F). A 2017 review concluded that there is strong evidence for past changes in the strength and structure of the AMOC during abrupt climate events such as the Younger Dryas and many of the Heinrich events.

A 2015 study led by James Hansen found that the shutdown or substantial slowdown of the AMOC, besides possibly contributing to extreme end-Eemian events, will cause a more general increase of severe weather. Additional surface cooling from ice melt increases surface and lower tropospheric temperature gradients, and causes in model simulations a large increase of mid-latitude eddy energy throughout the midlatitude troposphere. This in turn leads to an increase of baroclinicity produced by stronger temperature gradients, which provides energy for more severe weather events. This includes winter and near-winter cyclonic storms colloquially known as "superstorms", which generate near-hurricane-force winds and often large amounts of snowfall. These results imply that strong cooling in the North Atlantic from AMOC shutdown potentially increases seasonal mean wind speed of the northeasterlies by as much as 10–20% relative to preindustrial conditions. Because wind power dissipation is proportional to the cube of wind speed, this translates into an increase of storm power dissipation by a factor ∼1.4–2,. However, the simulated changes refer to seasonal mean winds averaged over large grid-boxes, not individual storms.
 
In 2017, a study evaluated the effects of a shutdown on El Niño–Southern Oscillation (ENSO), but found no overall impact, with divergent atmospheric processes cancelling each other out.  In 2021, a study using a Community Earth System Model suggested that an AMOC slowdown could nevertheless increase the strength of El Niño–Southern Oscillation and thus amplify climate extremes, especially if another Meridional Overturning Circulation develops in the Pacific Ocean in response to AMOC slowdown. In contrast, a 2022 study showed that an AMOC collapse is likely to accelerate the Pacific trade winds and Walker circulation, while weakening Indian and South Atlantic subtropical highs. The next study from the same team showed that the result of those altered atmospheric patterns is a ∼30% reduction in ENSO variability and a ∼95% reduction in the frequency of extreme El Niño events. Unlike today, El Niño events become more frequent in the central rather than eastern Pacific El Niño events.  At the same time, this would essentially make a La Nina state dominant across the globe, likely leading to more frequent extreme rainfall over eastern Australia and worse droughts and bushfire seasons over southwestern United States.

In 2020, a study had assessed the impact of an AMOC collapse on farming and food production in Great Britain. It estimated that AMOC collapse would reverse the impact of global warming in Great Britain and cause an average temperature drop of 3.4 °C. Moreover, it would lower rainfall during the growing season by around <123mm, which would in turn reduce the land area suitable for arable farming from the 32% to 7%. The net value of British farming would decline by around £346 million per year, or over 10%.

A 2021 study used a simplified modelling approach to evaluate the impact of a shutdown on the Amazon rainforest and its hypothesized dieback and transition to a savannah state in some climate change scenarios. It suggested that a shutdown would enhance rainfall over the southern Amazon due to the shift of an Intertropical Convergence Zone and thus would help to counter the dieback and potentially stabilize at least the southern part of the rainforest.

Trends

Reconstructions 

Climate reconstructions generally support the hypothesis that the AMOC is already weaker now than it was in the early 20th century. For instance, a 2010 statistical analysis found an ongoing weakening of the AMOC since the late 1930s, with an abrupt shift of a North Atlantic overturning cell around 1970. Climate scientists Michael Mann of Penn State and Stefan Rahmstorf from the Potsdam Institute for Climate Impact Research suggested that the observed cold pattern during years of temperature records is a sign that the Atlantic Ocean's Meridional overturning circulation (AMOC) may be weakening. They published their findings in 2015, and concluded that the AMOC circulation was slowing throughout the 20th century, and that the weakness it demonstrated after 1975 was unprecedented over the last millennium. They suggested that even though the AMOC had experienced partial recovery after 1975, future Greenland ice sheet melt would be likely to weaken it further still. Another 2015 study suggested that the AMOC has weakened by 15-20% in 200 years. In 2018, another reconstruction suggested a weakening of around 15% since the mid-twentieth century. However, all these findings were challenged by 2022 research which indicated that between 1900 and 2019, a climate change-induced trend did not begin to emerge until 1980, and it is still faint relative to the circulation's natural variability.

Some studies attempt to go deeper into the preindustrial past. In 2018, one such paper suggested that the last 150 years of AMOC showed exceptional weakness when compared to the previous 1500 years, and it indicated a discrepancy in the modeled timing of AMOC decline after the Little Ice Age. In February 2021, a study published in Nature Geoscience reported that the preceding millennium had seen an unprecedented weakening of the AMOC, an indication that the change was caused by human actions. Its co-author said that AMOC had already slowed by about 15%, with impacts now being seen: "In 20 to 30 years it is likely to weaken further, and that will inevitably influence our weather, so we would see an increase in storms and heatwaves in Europe, and sea level rises on the east coast of the US." In February 2022, Nature Geoscience published a "Matters Arising" commentary article co-authored by 17 scientists, which disputed those findings and argued that the long-term AMOC trend remains uncertain. The journal had also published a response from the authors of 2021 study to "Matters Arising" article, where they defended their findings.

In February 2021, a study had reconstructed the past 30 years of AMOC variability and found no evidence of decline. In August 2021, study published in Nature Climate Change  showed significant changes in eight independent AMOC indices, and suggested that they could indicate "an almost complete loss of stability". However, while it drew on over a century of ocean temperature and salinity data, it was forced to omit all data from 35 years before 1900 and after 1980 in order to maintain consistent records of all eight indicators. In April 2022, another study published in Nature Climate Change used nearly 120 years of data between 1900 and 2019 and found no change between 1900 and 1980, with a single-sverdrup reduction in AMOC strength not emerging until 1980 - a variation which remains within range of natural variability. A March 2022 review article concluded that while there may be a long-term weakening of the AMOC caused by global warming, it remains difficult to detect when analyzing its evolution since 1980, as that time frame presents both periods of weakening and strengthening, and the magnitude of either change is uncertain (in range between 5% and 25%). The review concluded with a call for more sensitive and longer-term research.

Observations

Direct observations of the strength of the AMOC have been available only since 2004 from the RAPID array, an in situ mooring array at 26°N in the Atlantic, leaving only indirect evidence of the previous AMOC behavior. While climate models predict a weakening of AMOC under global warming scenarios, they often struggle to match observations or reconstructions of the current. In particular, observed decline in the period 2004–2014 was of a factor 10 higher than that predicted by climate models participating in Phase 5 of the Coupled Model Intercomparison Project (CMIP5): however, some scientists attributed this to a larger-than-anticipated interdecadal variability of the circulation, rather than a climate-forced trend, suggesting that the AMOC would recover from it in only a few years. In February 2021, a study indicated that the AMOC did in fact recover from that decline, and found no evidence of an overall AMOC decline over the past 30 years. Likewise, a Science Advances study published in 2020 found no significant change in the AMOC circulation relative to 1990s, in spite of the substantial changes in the North Atlantic Ocean over the same period.

2010 and earlier
In April 2004, the hypothesis that the Gulf Stream is switching off received a boost when a retrospective analysis of U.S. satellite data seemed to show a slowing of the North Atlantic Gyre, the northern swirl of the Gulf Stream.

In May 2005, Peter Wadhams reported in The Times (London) about the results of investigations in a submarine under the Arctic ice sheet measuring the giant chimneys of cold dense water, in which the cold dense water normally sinks down to the sea bed and is replaced by warm water, forming one of the engines of the North Atlantic Drift. He and his team found the chimneys to have virtually disappeared. Normally there are seven to twelve giant columns, but Wadhams found only two giant columns, both extremely weak.

In 2005 a 30% reduction in the warm currents that carry water north from the Gulf Stream was observed from the last such measurement in 1992.  The authors noted uncertainties in the measurements. Following media discussions, Detlef Quadfasel pointed out that the uncertainty of the estimates of Bryden et al. is high, but says other factors and observations do support their results, and implications based on palaeoclimate records show drops of air temperature up to 10 °C within decades, linked to abrupt switches of ocean circulation when a certain threshold is reached. He concluded that further observations and modelling are crucial for providing early warning of a possible devastating breakdown of the circulation. In response Quirin Schiermeier concluded that natural variation was the culprit for the observations but highlighted possible implications.

In 2008, Vage et al. reported "the return of deep convection to the subpolar gyre in both the Labrador and Irminger seas in the winter of 2007–2008," employing "profiling float data from the Argo program to document deep mixing," and "a variety of in situ, satellite and reanalysis data" to set the context for the phenomenon. This might have a lot to do with the observations of variations in cold water chimney behaviour.

Projections 
The research around the future strength of the AMOC is shown below in chronological order. It is primarily based on Atmosphere-Ocean General Circulation Models projections, although large reviews like the IPCC reports are also informed by the present-day observations and historical reconstructions, which allows them to take a wider range of possibilities into account and assign likelihood to the events not explicitly covered by the models.

Around 2001, the IPCC Third Assessment Report projected high confidence that the THC would tend to weaken rather than stop, and that the warming effects would outweigh the cooling, even over Europe.

When the IPCC Fifth Assessment Report was published in 2014, a rapid transition of the AMOC was considered very unlikely, and this assessment was offered at a high confidence level. That assessment had several limitations, such a reported bias of CMIP models towards AMOC stability, and the insufficient analysis of the impacts on circulation caused by Greenland Ice Sheet meltwater intrusion.

In 2016, a study aimed to redress this shortcoming by adding Greenland ice sheet melt estimates to the projections from eight state-of-the-art climate models. It found that by 2090–2100, the AMOC would weaken by around 18% (with a range of potential weakening between 3% and 34%) under the "intermediate" Representative Concentration Pathway 4.5, while it would weaken by 37% (with a range between 15% and 65%) under Representative Concentration Pathway 8.5, which presents a scenario of continually increasing emissions. When the two scenarios are extended past 2100, AMOC stabilized under RCP 4.5, but continues to decline under RCP 8.5, with an average decline of 74% by 2290–2300 and a 44% likelihood of an outright collapse.

In 2017, another study applied bias correction to Community Climate System Model and simulated an idealized scenario where  concentrations abruptly double from 1990 levels and remain stable afterwards: according to the authors, such concentrations would result in a warming approximately between RCP 4.5 and RCP 6.0. The AMOC remained stable in a standard model, but collapsed after 300 years of simulation in a bias-corrected model.

In 2020, a study ran simulations of RCP 4.5 and RCP 8.5 between 2005 and 2250 in a Community Earth System Model integrated with an advanced ocean physics module which allowed for a more realistic representation of Antarctic ice sheet meltwater. Freshwater input was between 4 and 8 times higher in the modified RCP 4.5 scenario compared to the control run (an increase from 0.1 to 0.4-0.8 sverdrup), and 5 to 10 times stronger in the modified RCP 8.5 scenario (from 0.2 to an average of 1 sverdrup, with the peak values over 2 sverdrup around 2125 due to the collapse of the Ross Ice Shelf). In both RCP 4.5 simulations, AMOC declines from its current strength of 24 sverdrup to 19 sverdrup by 2100: after 2200, it begins to recover in the control simulation but stays at 19 sverdrup in the modified simulation. Under both RCP 8.5 simulations, there's a near-collapse of the current as it declines to 8 sverdrup past 2100 and stays at that level until the end of the simulation period: in the modified simulation, it takes 35 years longer to reach 8 sverdrup than in the control run.

Another study published in 2020 analyzed how the AMOC would be impacted by temperature stabilizing at 1.5 degrees, 2 degrees (the two Paris Agreement goals, both well below the warming under of RCP 4.5) or 3 degrees by 2100 (slightly above the expected warming by 2100 under RCP 4.5). In all three cases, the AMOC declines for an additional 5–10 years after the temperature rise ceases, but it does not come close to collapse, and recovers its strength after about 150 years.

In 2021, the IPCC Sixth Assessment Report again assessed that the AMOC is very likely to decline within the 21st century, and expressed high confidence that changes to it would be reversible within centuries if the warming was reversed. Unlike the Fifth Assessment Report, it had only expressed medium confidence rather than high confidence in AMOC avoiding a collapse before the end of the century. This reduction in confidence was likely influenced by several review studies drawing attention to the circulation stability bias within general circulation models, as well as simplified ocean modelling studies suggesting that the AMOC may be more vulnerable to abrupt change than what the larger-scale models suggest.

In 2022, a study performed modelling experiments with three climate models participating in Aerosol and Chemistry Model Intercomparison Project, and it found that very aggressive mitigation of air pollution like particulates and ground-level ozone could weaken AMOC circulation by 10% by the end of the century if it happened on its own, due to the reduction in climate-cooling stratospheric sulfur aerosols. The authors recommended pairing air pollution mitigation with the mitigation of methane emissions in order to avoid this outcome, as both methane (a strong warming agent) and sulfate aerosols (a cooling agent) are similarly short-lived in the atmosphere, and a simultaneous reduction of both would cancel out their effects.

In 2022, an extensive assessment of all potential climate tipping points identified 16 plausible climate tipping points, including a collapse of the AMOC. It suggested that a collapse would most likely be triggered by 4 degrees Celsius of global warming, but that there's enough uncertainty to suggest it could be triggered at warming levels as low as 1.4 degrees, or as high as 8 degrees. Likewise, it estimates that once AMOC collapse is triggered, it would most likely take place over 50 years, but the entire range is between 15 and 300 years. Finally, it concludes that this collapse would lower global temperatures by around 0.5 degrees Celsius, while regional temperatures in Europe would go down by between 4 and 10 degrees Celsius. That assessment also treated the collapse of the Northern Subpolar Gyre as a potential separate tipping point, which could occur at between 1.1 degrees and 3.8 degrees of warming (although this is only simulated by a fraction of climate models). The most likely figure is 1.8 degrees, and once triggered, the collapse of the gyre would most likely take 10 years from start to end, with a range between 5 and 50 years. The loss of this convection is estimated to lower the global temperature by 0.5 degrees, while the average temperature in Europe decreases by around 3 degrees. There are also substantial impacts on regional precipitation.

Society and culture

In popular culture 
The film The Day After Tomorrow and the British TV Series Ice both explore exaggerated scenarios related to the AMOC shutdown.

An Inconvenient Truth includes reference to the potential shutdown of the AMOC and its impact on temperatures in Europe if ice sheets were to melt and cause elevated freshwater flows in the North Atlantic.

Kim Stanley Robinson's science-fiction novel Fifty Degrees Below, a volume in his Science in the Capital series, depicts a shutdown of thermohaline circulation and mankind's efforts to counteract it by adding great quantities of salt to the ocean.

In Ian Douglas' Star Corpsman novels, an AMOC shutdown triggers an early glacial maximum, covering most of Canada and northern Europe in ice sheets by the mid-22nd century.

See also 

8.2-kiloyear event
Climate security
Cold blob
Loop Current of the Gulf of Mexico
Anoxic event
Pacific decadal oscillation
Paleosalinity, changes in which are thought to slow down the THC
West Greenland Current
Younger Dryas

References

External links 
Project THOR University of Hamburg project to study the thermohaline circulation
"An Abrupt Climate Change Scenario and Its Implications for United States National Security" (2003 study)
What If the Conveyor Were to Shut Down? Reflections on a Possible Outcome of the Great Global Experiment (1999 study)
A Nasty Surprise in the Greenhouse (Video about the shutdown of the thermohaline circulation, 2015)
Why is there a thermohaline circulation in the Atlantic but not the Pacific?  (2005 technical report)
 Original article at the Encyclopedia of Earth

Climate change and the environment
Effects of climate change
Oceanography
Natural hazards
Future problems
Currents of the Atlantic Ocean